Yantai Penglai International Airport  is an airport serving the city of Yantai in Shandong Province, China.

Construction officially started on 26 December 2009, and the airport was opened on 28 May 2015, when all flights serving Yantai were transferred from the old Laishan Airport. The first flight, China Eastern Airlines MU5136, landed at the airport from Beijing at 00:05 on 28 May. Originally called Yantai Chaoshui International Airport, the airport adopted the current name in April 2014.

Facilities
The airport has a runway that is 3,400 meters long and 45 meters wide (class 4D), and an 80,000 square-meter terminal building.  It is projected to serve 12 million passengers and 90,000 tons of cargo annually by 2020.

Airlines and destinations

See also
List of airports in China
List of the busiest airports in China

References

Airports in Shandong
Airports established in 2015
2015 establishments in China
Yantai